The French Academy of Sciences (French: Académie des sciences) is a learned society, founded in 1666 by Louis XIV at the suggestion of Jean-Baptiste Colbert, to encourage and protect the spirit of French scientific research. It was at the forefront of scientific developments in Europe in the 17th and 18th centuries, and is one of the earliest Academies of Sciences.

Currently headed by Patrick Flandrin (President of the Academy), it is one of the five Academies of the Institut de France.

History 

The Academy of Sciences traces its origin to Colbert's plan to create a general academy. He chose a small group of scholars who met on 22 December 1666 in the King's library, near the present-day Bibliothèque Nationals, and thereafter held twice-weekly working meetings there in the two rooms assigned to the group. The first 30 years of the Academy's existence were relatively informal, since no statutes had as yet been laid down for the institution.

In contrast to its British counterpart, the Academy was founded as an organ of government. In Paris, there weren't many membership openings, to fill positions there were tenacious elections. The election process was at least a 6-stage process with rules and regulations that allowed for chosen candidates to canvas other members and for current members to consider postponing certain stages of the process if the need would arise. Elections in the early days of the academy were important activities, and as such made up a large part of the proceedings at the academy, with many meetings being held regarding the election to fill a single vacancy within the academy. That is not to say that discussion of candidates and the election process as a whole was relegated to the meetings. Members that belonged to the vacancy's respective field would continue discussion of potential candidates for the vacancy in private. Being elected into the Academy didn't necessarily guarantee being a full member, in some cases, one would enter the academy as an associate or correspondent before being appointed as a full member of the academy.

The election process was originally only to replace members from a specific section. For example, if someone whose study was mathematics was either removed or resigned from his position, the following election process nominated only those whose focus was also mathematics in order to fill that discipline's vacancy. This led to some periods of time where they couldn't find specialists for specific fields of study, and had to have positions in those fields vacant, unable to fill them with people in other disciplines.

The reform needed came late in the 20th century, when in 1987, the academy decided against the practice, favoring filling vacancies with people with new disciplines. This reform was not only aimed at further diversifying the disciplines under the academy, but also to help combat the internal aging of the academy itself. The Academy was expected to remain apolitical, and to avoid discussion of religious and social issues. 

On 20 January 1699, Louis XIV gave the Company its first rules. The Academy received the name of Royal Academy of Sciences and was installed in the Louvre in Paris. Following this reform, the Academy began publishing a volume each year with information on all the work done by its members and obituaries for members who had died. This reform also codified the method by which members of the Academy could receive pensions for their work.

The academy was originally organized by the royal reform hierarchically into the following groups: Pensionaires, Pupils, Honoraires, and Associés.

The reform also added new groups not previously recognized, such as Vétéran. Some of these role's member limits were expanded and some roles even removed or combined throughout the course of academy's history. The Honoraires group establish by this reform in 1699 whose members were directly appointed by the King was recognized until its abolishment in 1793.

Membership in the academy only exceeded 100 officially recognized full members in 1976, 310 years after the academy's inception in 1666. The membership increase came with a large-scale reorganization in 1976. Under this reorganization, 130 resident members, 160 correspondents, and 80 foreign associates could be elected.

A vacancy only opens upon the death of a member, as they serve for life. During elections, half of the vacancies are reserved for people less than 55 years old. This was created as an attempt to encourage younger members to join the academy.

The reorganization also divided the academy into 2 divisions:

One division, Division 1, covers the applications of mathematics and physical sciences,

the other, Division 2, covers the applications of chemical, natural, biological, and medical sciences.

On 8 August 1793, the National Convention abolished all the academies. On 22 August 1795, a National Institute of Sciences and Arts was put in place, bringing together the old academies of the sciences, literature and arts, among them the Académie française and the Académie des sciences.

Also in 1795, The Academy determined these 10 titles (first 4 in Division 1 and the others in Division 2) e to be their newly accepted branches of scientific study:

 Mathematics
 Mechanics
 Astronomy
 Physics
 Chemistry
 Mineralogy
 Botany
 Agriculture
 Anatomy and Zoology
 Medicine and Surgery

The last two sections are bundled since there were many good candidates fit to be elected for those practices, and the competition was stiff. Some individuals like Francois Magendie had made stellar advancements in their selected fields of study, that warranted a possible addition of new fields. However, even someone like Magendie that had made breakthroughs in Physiology and impressed the Academy with his hands-on vivisection experiments, could not get his study into its own category. Despite Magendie being one of the leading innovators of his time, it was still a battle for him to become an official member of the Academy, a feat he would later accomplish in 1821. He further improved the reverence of the academy when he and anatomist Charles Bell produced the widely known "Bell-Magendie Law".

From 1795 until 1914, the first world war, the French Academy of Science was the most prevalent organization of French science. Almost all the old members of the previously abolished Académie were formally re-elected and retook their ancient seats. Among the exceptions was Dominique, comte de Cassini, who refused to take his seat. Membership in the Academy was not restricted to scientists: in 1798 Napoleon Bonaparte was elected a member of the Academy and three years later a president in connection with his Egyptian expedition, which had a scientific component. In 1816, the again renamed "Royal Academy of Sciences" became autonomous, while forming part of the Institute of France; the head of State became its patron. In the Second Republic, the name returned to Académie des sciences. During this period, the Academy was funded by and accountable to the Ministry of Public Instruction.
The Academy came to control French patent laws in the course of the eighteenth century, acting as the liaison of artisans' knowledge to the public domain. As a result, academicians dominated technological activities in France.
The Academy proceedings were published under the name Comptes rendus de l'Académie des Sciences (1835–1965). The Comptes rendus is now a journal series with seven titles. The publications can be found on site of the French National Library.

In 1818 the French Academy of Sciences launched a competition to explain the properties of light. The civil engineer Augustin-Jean Fresnel entered this competition by submitting a new wave theory of light. Siméon Denis Poisson, one of the members of the judging committee, studied Fresnel's theory in detail. Being a supporter of the particle-theory of light, he looked for a way to disprove it. Poisson thought that he had found a flaw when he demonstrate that Fresnel's theory predicts that an on-axis bright spot would exist in the shadow of a circular obstacle, where there should be complete darkness according to the particle-theory of light. The Poisson spot is not easily observed in every-day situations, so it was only natural for Poisson to interpret it as an absurd result and that it should disprove Fresnel's theory. However, the head of the committee, Dominique-François-Jean Arago, and who incidentally later became Prime Minister of France, decided to perform the experiment in more detail. He molded a 2-mm metallic disk to a glass plate with wax. To everyone's surprise he succeeded in observing the predicted spot, which convinced most scientists of the wave-nature of light.

For three centuries women were not allowed as members of the Academy. This meant that many women scientists were excluded, including two-time Nobel Prize winner Marie Curie, Nobel winner Irène Joliot-Curie, mathematician Sophie Germain, and many other deserving women scientists. The first woman admitted as a correspondent member was a student of Curie's, Marguerite Perey, in 1962.  The first female full member was Yvonne Choquet-Bruhat in 1979. 

Membership in the academy is highly geared towards representing common French populace demographics. French population increases and changes in the early 21st century led to the academy expanding reference population sizes by reform in the early 2002.

The overwhelming majority of members leave the academy posthumously, with a few exceptions of removals, transfers, and resignations. The last member to be removed from the academy was in 1944. Removal from the academy was often for not performing to standards, not performing at all, leaving the country, or political reasons. In some rare occasions, a member has been elected twice and subsequently removed twice. This is the case for Marie-Adolphe Carnot.

Government interference 
The most direct involvement of the government in the affairs of the institute came in the initial nomination of members in 1795. But as the members nominated constituted only one-third of the membership and most of these had previously been elected as members of the respective Academies under the old regime, few objections were raised. Moreover, these nominated members were then completely free to nominate the remaining members of the institute. Members expected to remain such for life, but interference occurred in a few cases where the government suddenly terminated membership for political reasons. The other main interference came when the government refused to accept the result of Academy elections. The academies control by the government was apparent in 1803, when Bonaparte decided on a general reorganization. His principal concern was not the First class but the Second, which included political scientists who were potential critics of his government. Bonaparte abolished the second class completely and, after a few expulsions, redistributed its remaining members, together with those of the Third class, into a new Second class concerned with literature and a new Third class devoted to the fine arts. Still this relationship between the Academy and the government was not a one-way affair, as members expected to receive their payment of an honorarium.

Decline 
Although the Academy still exists today, after World War I, the reputation and status of the Academy was largely questioned. One factor behind its decline was the development from a meritocracy to gerontocracy: a shift from those with demonstrated scientific ability leading the Academy to instead favoring those with seniority. It became known as a sort of "hall of fame" that lost control, real and symbolic, of the professional scientific diversity in France at the time. Another factor was that in the span of five years, 1909 to 1914, funding to science faculties considerably dropped, eventually leading to a financial crisis in France.

Present use 

Today the Academy is one of five academies comprising the Institut de France. Its members are elected for life. Currently, there are 150 full members, 300 corresponding members, and 120 foreign associates. They are divided into two scientific groups: the Mathematical and Physical sciences and their applications and the Chemical, Biological, Geological and Medical sciences and their applications. The Academy currently has five missions that its pursuing. These being the encouraging of the scientific life, promoting the teaching of science, transmitting knowledge between scientific communities, fostering international collaborations, and ensuring a dual role of expertise and advise. The French Academy of Science originally focused its development efforts into creating a true co-development Euro-African program beginning in 1997. Since then they have broadened their scope of action to other regions of the world. The standing committee COPED is in charge of the international development projects undertaken by the French Academy of Science and their associates. The current president of COPED is Pierre Auger, the vice president is Michel Delseny, and the honorary president is Francois Gros. All of which are current members of the French Academy of Science. COPED has hosted several workshops or colloquia in Paris, involving representatives from African academies, universities or research centers, addressing a variety of themes and challenges dealing with African development and covering a large field spectrum. Specifically higher education in sciences, and research practices in basic and applied sciences that deal with various aspects relevant to development (renewable energy, infectious diseases, animal pathologies, food resources, access to safe water, agriculture, urban health, etc.).

Current committees and working parties 
The Academic Standing Committees and Working Parties prepare the advice notes, policy statements and the Academic Reports. Some have a statutory remit, such as the Select Committee, the Committee for International Affairs and the Committee for Scientists' Rights, some are created ad hoc by the Academy and approved formally by vote in a Members-only session.

Today the academies standing committees and working parties include:

 The Academic Standing Committee in charge of the Biennial Report on Science and Technology
 The Academic Standing Committee for Science, Ethics and Society
 The Academic Standing Committee for the Environment
 The Academic Standing Committee for Space Research
 The Academic Standing Committee for Science and Metrology
 The Academic Standing Committee for the Science History and Epistemology
 The Academic Standing Committee for Science and Safety Issues
 The Academic Standing Committee for Science Education and Training
 The Academic Standing La main à la pâte Committee
 The Academic Standing Committee for the Defense of Scientists' Rights (CODHOS)
 The Academic Standing Committee for International Affairs (CORI)
 The French Committee for International Scientific Unions (COFUSI)
 The Academic Standing Committee for Scientific and Technological International Relations (CARIST)
 The Academic Standing Committee for Developing Countries (COPED)
 The Inter-academic Group for Development (GID) – Cf. for further reading
 The Academic Standing Commission for Sealed Deposits
 The Academic Standing Committee for Terminology and Neologisms
 The Antoine Lavoisier Standing Committee
 The Academic Standing Committee for Prospects in Energy Procurement
 The Special Academic Working Party on Scientific Computing
 The Special Academic Working Party on Material Sciences and Engineering

Medals, awards and prizes 

Each year, the Academy of Sciences distributes about 80 prizes. These include:

 the Grande Médaille, awarded annually, in rotation, in the relevant disciplines of each division of the Academy, to a French or foreign scholar who has contributed to the development of science in a decisive way.
 the Lalande Prize, awarded from 1802 through 1970, for outstanding achievement in astronomy
 the Valz Prize, awarded from 1877 through 1970, to honor advances in astronomy
 the Richard Lounsbery Award, jointly with the National Academy of Sciences
 the Prix Jacques Herbrand, for mathematics and physics
 the Prix Paul Pascal, for chemistry
 the Louis Bachelier Prize for major contributions to mathematical modeling in finance
 the Prix Michel Monpetit for computer science and applied mathematics, awarded since 1977
 the Leconte Prize, awarded annually since 1886, to recognize important discoveries in mathematics, physics, chemistry, natural history or medicine
 the Prix Tchihatcheff (Tchihatchef; Chikhachev)

People 

The following are incomplete lists of the officers of the Academy.  See also :Category:Officers of the French Academy of Sciences.

For a list of the Academy's members past and present, see :Category:Members of the French Academy of Sciences

Presidents 
Source: French Academy of Sciences

Treasurers 
 ?–1788 Georges-Louis Leclerc, Comte de Buffon
 1788–1791 Mathieu Tillet

Permanent secretaries

General

Mathematical Sciences

Physical Sciences

Chemistry and Biology

Publications
 Publications of the French Academy of Sciences "Histoire de l'Académie royale des sciences" (1700–1790)

See also 
 French art salons and academies
 French Geodesic Mission
 History of the metre
 Seconds pendulum
 Royal Commission on Animal Magnetism

Notes

References 

 Stéphane Schmitt, "Studies on animals and the rise of comparative anatomy at and around the Parisian Royal Academy of Sciences in the eighteenth century," Science in Context 29 (1), 2016, pp. 11–54.

External links 

   – English-language version
 Complete listing of current members
 Notes on the Académie des Sciences from the Scholarly Societies project (includes information on the society journals)
 Search the Proceedings of the Académie des sciences in the French National Library (search item: Comptes Rendus)
 Comptes rendus de l'Académie des sciences. Série 1, Mathématique in Gallica, the digital library of the BnF.

 
France
Sciences
1666 establishments in France
Educational institutions established in the 1660s
Scientific organizations established in 1666
Members of the International Council for Science
Members of the International Science Council